The Moldovan National Badminton Championships is a tournament organized to crown the best badminton players in Moldova. They are held since 1995.

Past winners

References
Badminton Europe - Details of affiliated national organisations
Moldavian Badminton Federation tournament results

Badminton tournaments in Moldova
National badminton championships
Recurring sporting events established in 1995
Sports competitions in Moldova
1995 establishments in Moldova
Badminton